Homer and Eddie is a 1989 American comedy film starring Whoopi Goldberg and Jim Belushi and directed by  Andrei Konchalovsky.

This was Anne Ramsey's final performance. The film received generally poor reviews from critics.

Plot
A homicidal escaped mental patient with a brain tumor with only a month to live meets a childlike, mentally challenged man, who becomes her traveling companion for a cross-country car trip that brings unexpected meaning to both their lives.

Cast
 Jim Belushi as Homer Lanza
 Whoopi Goldberg as Eddie Cervi 
 Karen Black as Belle
 Anne Ramsey as Edna
 Beah Richards as Linda Cervi
 John Waters as Robber
 Mickey Jones as Pizza Chef
 Tad Horino as Mickey
 Vincent Schiavelli as Priest
 Fritz Feld as Mortician (in his last film role)
 Tracey Walter as Tommy Dearly
 Barbara Pilavin as Mrs. Lanza
 Angelo Bertolini as Mr. Lanza
 Nick LaTour as Bar Customer

Soundtrack

Reception

Critical response
Homer and Eddie has an approval rating of 0% on review aggregator website Rotten Tomatoes, based on 7 reviews, and an average rating of 2.67/10.

References

External reviews

1980s American films
1980s comedy road movies
1980s English-language films
1989 comedy films
1989 films
American comedy road movies
Fictional duos
Films directed by Andrei Konchalovsky
Films scored by Eduard Artemyev